Space Bunnies Must Die! is a third-person action-adventure game originally developed by Pulse Entertainment but ultimately by Ripcord Games and released on October 27, 1998 by Jinx for Microsoft Windows 98. The player character is truck stop waitress and rodeo performer Allison Huxter, who must save the world and her abducted sister from an invading race of mutant bunnies from space.

Space Bunnies Must Die! was pitched to Fox and Comedy Central as a humorous animated series.

Development
Space Bunnies Must Die! Early development concepts had The main character Allison going to be part of the military. The game revolved around her going around the small town of Harvill, USA scavenging for items, unlocking different areas of the town, and of course, killing space bunnies. There was originally going to be a multiplayer as well where you could either be a human, or a space bunny.

Gameplay
Space Bunnies Must Die! has the  run-jump-climb-shoot style of gameplay, similar to the early Tomb Raider series. The game has nine levels, of varying levels of difficulty. On successfully completing those levels, there is a final level.

Reception

Criticized for its bland gameplay, confusing levels, and game-breaking glitches, Space Bunnies Must Die! received mixed reviews according to the review aggregation website GameRankings. Next Generation, however, said of the game, "If you overlook the ridiculous plot and don't mind fighting your way through the bugs and smirking bunnies, you might actually enjoy yourself."

Panasonic Interactive Media, parent of Ripcord Games, invested heavily in Space Bunnies Must Die!s advertising and development. However, it became a commercial failure: the NPD Group reported sales of 2,458 copies for 1998. The game was one of several missteps by Panasonic Interactive Media that led to its closure in March 1999, with Ripcord Games sold to an anonymous outside group.

References

External links
 

1998 video games
Ripcord Games games
Single-player video games
Third-person shooters
Video games developed in the United States
Video games featuring female protagonists
Windows games
Windows-only games